Immariana is a genus of moths belonging to the subfamily Tortricinae of the family Tortricidae.

Species
Immariana acutiella Park & Byun, 1991

See also
List of Tortricidae genera

References

External links
tortricidae.com

Tortricidae genera